Craugastor emleni is a species of frog in the family Craugastoridae.
It is endemic to Honduras.
Its natural habitats are subtropical or tropical moist montane forests, rivers, and plantations .

References

emleni
Endemic fauna of Honduras
Amphibians of Honduras
Frogs of North America
Critically endangered fauna of North America
Amphibians described in 1932
Taxonomy articles created by Polbot